The 2014 Lahore market fire was a fire that broke out on 29 December 2014 in a shopping mall named Khalid Plaza located in Urdu Bazar area of Lahore, Pakistan. The cause was identified as a short circuit. The fire killed at least 13 people, with two injured.

The fire
A short circuit at a shop sparked a fire in the three-story shopping center at the Anarkali bazaar. The shopping centre had no firefighting equipment and facilities and no emergency exits were available, causing suffocation when people tried to flee through a single exit. Most of the 13 killed in the incident died as a result of this suffocation.

See also
 List of accidents and disasters by death toll
 List of building or structure fires
Other shopping mall disasters:
Campbell Shopping Complex fire (1976)
Ycuá Bolaños supermarket fire (2004)

References

2014 fires in Asia
2014 in Pakistan
Fires in Pakistan
History of Punjab, Pakistan (1947–present)
2010s in Lahore
December 2014 events in Pakistan
Disasters in Punjab, Pakistan